The 2016–17 season was Feyenoord's 109th season of play, it marked its 61st season in the Eredivisie and its 95th consecutive season in the top flight of Dutch football. It was the second season with manager Giovanni van Bronckhorst, a former player who played seven seasons for Feyenoord and who played 106 times for Dutch national team. Feyenoord entered the KNVB Cup in the first round and the Europa League in the group stage.

Feyenoord started their league campaign with nine straight wins. They won another four before the winter break and halfway point of the season to get to 42 points from 17 games. They were still active in the KNVB Cup, having beaten three contenders. Their Europa League adventure ended in the group stage after getting to seven points in six matches. This included a home win against Manchester United.

They restarted after the winter stop with two wins before being knocked out of the KNVB cup in the quarter-finals. They continued winning, amassing a 10-game winning streak before losing three of the last 10 games of the season. Feyenoord never gave up first place in the standings, taking the national championship in the  last game with captain Dirk Kuyt scoring all three goals.

Eredivisie

League table

Results summary

Results by matchday

League matches

KNVB Cup

Johan Cruyff Shield

Europa League

Group stage

Group A table

Group matches

Player details

Appearances (Apps.) numbers are for appearances in competitive games only including sub appearances
Red card numbers denote:   Numbers in parentheses represent red cards overturned for wrongful dismissal.

Transfers

In:

Out:

References

Feyenoord seasons
Feyenoord
Feyenoord
Dutch football championship-winning seasons